Dysstroma is a genus of moths in the family Geometridae erected by Jacob Hübner in 1825.

Species

 Dysstroma brunneata (Packard, 1867)
 Dysstroma brunneoviridatum (Heydemann, 1938)
 Dysstroma cinereata (Moore, 1867)
 Dysstroma citrata (Linnaeus, 1761) – dark marbled carpet
 Dysstroma colvillei Blackmore, 1926
 Dysstroma concinnata (Stephens, 1831)
 Dysstroma corussaria (Oberthür, 1880)
 Dysstroma dentifera (Warren 1896)
 Dysstroma formosa (Hulst, 1896)
 Dysstroma hersiliata (Guenée, 1857)
 Dysstroma fumata (Bastelberger, 1911)
 Dysstroma hewlettaria W.S. Wright, 1927
 Dysstroma infuscata (Tengström, 1869)
 Dysstroma korbi Heydemann, 1929
 Dysstroma latefasciata (Staudinger, 1889)
 Dysstroma mancipata (Guenée, 1857)
 Dysstroma ochrofuscaria Swett, 1917
 Dysstroma pseudimmanata (Heydemann, 1929)
 Dysstroma rectiflavata McDunnough, 1941
 Dysstroma rutlandia McDunnough, 1943
 Dysstroma sikkimensis Heydemann, 1932
 Dysstroma sobria Swett, 1917
 Dysstroma subapicarium (Moore, 1868)
 Dysstroma suspectana (Möschler, 1874)
 Dysstroma suspectata (Möschler, 1874)
 Dysstroma truncata (Hufnagel, 1767) – common marbled carpet
 Dysstroma walkerata (Pearsall, 1909)

References

External links

Cidariini
Taxa named by Johann Siegfried Hufnagel